Richard II (died 1111), called Richard of Aquila (Riccardo dell'Aquila), was the consul and duke of Gaeta, ruling from 1104 or 1105 to his death.

Riccardo di Aquila was the son of Bartolomeo, Count of Caleno, possibly from a junior branch of the Counts of Aversa 
.
Other researchers link him to the Norman lords of L'Aigle and assume him to be a younger son of Richer, the lord of L'Aigle, and nephew of Hugh d'Avranches, Earl of Chester. He conquered the duchy from his predecessor, William Blosseville, whom he exiled. He subsequently minted his own coinage as an independent prince.  He was also count of Suessa.

He lent troops to Pope Paschal II in 1108 to retake Rome. He was a constant ally of the pope and enemy of Ptolemy I of Tusculum.

Notes

References

Sources
Chronology of the ipati, consuls, dukes, princes, kings, and emperors who governed Gaeta from the 9th to the 13th Century.
The Coins of Gaeta.
Gregorovius, Ferdinand. Rome in the Middle Ages Vol. IV Part 1. 1905.
Thompson, Kathleen, "The Lords of Laigle: Ambition and Insecurity on the borders of Normandy" in Anglo-Norman Studies; XVIII; ed. Christopher Harper-Bill, Woodbridge, 1996, pp. 177–199.

1111 deaths
Italo-Normans
Norman warriors
12th-century Italian nobility
Dukes of Gaeta
Year of birth unknown